Scheidemann is a surname of German origin. It may refer to:

 Heinrich Scheidemann (c. 1595–1663), German organist and composer
 Henry Scheidemann (1877–1964), New York assemblyman
 Philipp Scheidemann (1865–1939), German Social Democratic politician

German-language surnames
Occupational surnames